Sparganothina laselvana is a species of moth of the family Tortricidae. It is found in Costa Rica.

The length of the forewings is 5-5.7 mm for males and 5.5-6.6 mm for females. The forewings are golden yellow with dark brown to paler brown and orange markings. The hindwings are pale golden brown.

Etymology
The species name refers to La Selva Biological Station were the type specimen was collected.

References

Moths described in 2001
Sparganothini